Alfred Washington Hales (born November 30, 1938) is an American mathematician, a professor emeritus of mathematics at the University of California, Los Angeles, and one of the namesakes of the Hales–Jewett theorem. He was born in Pasadena, California, and is the older brother of R. Stanton Hales.

Professional career
As an undergraduate, Hales was a two-time Putnam Fellow for the California Institute of Technology, in 1958 and 1959. Hales stayed at Caltech for his graduate studies, earning his Ph.D. in 1962 under the supervision of Robert P. Dilworth. He is the former chair of the mathematics department at UCLA, and in 2010 became chair of the board of trustees of the Institute for Pure and Applied Mathematics at UCLA.

Contributions
In 1963, Hales and Jewett published the Hales–Jewett theorem, which is a standard part of Ramsey theory now. They motivated their theorem as a form of game theory: it shows that certain high-dimensional generalizations of tic tac toe cannot have any tied positions.

Hales also contributed to Solomon W. Golomb's highly cited work on shift registers, and he has been noted for his work using Ulm invariants to characterize infinite abelian groups.

Awards and honors
In 1971, Hales shared the George Pólya Prize with Ronald Graham, Klaus Leeb, Bruce Lee Rothschild, and R. I. Jewett, for their work in Ramsey theory. In 2009, Hales was elected a Fellow of the AAAS, and in 2012 he became a fellow of the American Mathematical Society.

Selected publications

References

Living people
20th-century American mathematicians
21st-century American mathematicians
California Institute of Technology alumni
University of California, Los Angeles faculty
Putnam Fellows
Fellows of the American Association for the Advancement of Science
Fellows of the American Mathematical Society
1938 births
People from Pasadena, California
Mathematicians from California